The Championship Grand Final (previously the National League One Grand Final) is the championship-deciding game of the Championship competition via the playoffs. Since 2022 the Grand Final has also been used to determine promotion to Super League.

History

1998–2002: Institution
Due to the success of the Super League Grand Final that was introduced in 1998, the RFL decided to introduce a Grand Final for the second division' with the winner being promoted to Super League rather than the team finishing top being promoted.

2003–2007: Promotion
In 2003 as the Second Division was rebranded National League One and promotion and relegation was reintroduced between the Super League and National League One. Rather than having a traditional one up one down system, the RFL decided to implement a top 6 playoff system that was being used in the Super League at the time to decide promotion.

2008–2014: Licensing
In 2007 it was announced licensing was to be introduced for the 2008 season, replacing promotion and relegation, but the Grand Final would be retained and the division would be rebranded the Championship.

Salford and Celtic Crusaders were the first teams to be awarded Super League licenses and both teams reached the Grand Final which was reduced to being decided by a 5 team playoff, however it would return to six teams the following season.

In 2013, the playoffs were expanded for the first time to eight teams as it had been seen to be a success in the Super League for a number of years before. The eight team playoff would be the last before it was announced the Championship Grand Final would be scrapped in 2014 due to a league restructure in 2015.

2015–2018: Million Pound Game

In 2015 the Championship Grand Final was effectively replaced with the Million Pound Game. In the new league structure the top 4 Championship clubs would form a mini league with the bottom 4 Super League clubs. Teams finishing in the top three were promoted to Super League while teams in the bottom three were relegated to the Championship, meanwhile teams finishing 4th and 5th would play each other in the Million Pound Game for the final Super League place. In the four years it was contested three Championship clubs competed in it with 2018 being the only time both teams in it were from the Championship.

2022–present: Reintroduction
After scrapping the Super 8s in 2019 the RFL kept the Million Pound Game as the promotion final. For the 2022 season it was decided that the Million Pound Game branding was to be dropped in favour of the Grand Final for the first time since 2014.

Results

Winners

League Leaders

See also

Super League Grand Final
League 1 Promotion Final
Championship Leaders' Shield

References

External links

Championship (rugby league)
Recurring sporting events established in 2009
Grand finals